Xavier Noel (born July 11, 1976 in Les Abymes, Pointe-à-Pitre, Guadeloupe) is a French welterweight amateur boxer who won silver at the 2004 European Championships and participated in the 2004 Summer Olympics.

Career
At the European Championships he lost the final to Olympic gold medalist Oleg Saitov. At the Olympics he beat Andre Berto, and then lost to Ukrainian Viktor Polyakov. At the 2007 World Championships he was beaten early by Bakhyt Sarsekbayev.

References
Euro 2004
Yahoo bio
sports-reference

1976 births
Living people
Welterweight boxers
Boxers at the 2004 Summer Olympics
Olympic boxers of France
French people of Guadeloupean descent
French male boxers

Mediterranean Games gold medalists for France
Mediterranean Games silver medalists for France
Competitors at the 2001 Mediterranean Games
Competitors at the 2005 Mediterranean Games
Mediterranean Games medalists in boxing